Broken Top is a glacially eroded complex stratovolcano. It lies in the Cascade Volcanic Arc, part of the extensive Cascade Range in the U.S. state of Oregon. Eruptive activity stopped roughly 100,000 years ago, and currently, erosion by glaciers has reduced the volcano's cone to where its contents are exposed. There are two named glaciers on the peak, Bend and Crook Glacier.

Diverse species of flora and fauna inhabit the area, which is subject to frequent snowfall, occasional rain, and extreme temperature variation between seasons. Broken Top and its surrounding area constitute popular destinations for hiking, climbing, and scrambling.

Geography 
It is part of the Cascade Range in Oregon, in the Three Sisters Wilderness, which lies in Deschutes County. The mountain has an elevation of  according to Hildreth (2007).

Wilderness 
Designated by the United States Congress in 1964, it borders the Mount Washington Wilderness to the north and shares its southern edge with the Waldo Lake Wilderness. The area includes  of trails and many forests, lakes, waterfalls, and streams, including the source of Whychus Creek. The Three Sisters and Broken Top account for about a third of the Three Sisters Wilderness, and this area is known as the Alpine Crest Region.

Physical geography 
Weather varies greatly in the area due to the rain shadow caused by the Cascade Range. Air from the Pacific Ocean rises over the western slopes, which causes it to cool and dump its moisture as rain (or snow in the winter). Precipitation increases with elevation. Once the moisture is wrung from the air, it descends on the eastern side of the crest, which causes the air to be warmer and drier. Temperature extremes reach  in summers and  during the winters.

Before settlement of the area at the end of the 19th century, wildfires frequently burned through the local forests, especially the ponderosa pine forests on the eastern slopes. Due to fire suppression over the past century, the forests have become overgrown, and at higher elevations, they are further susceptible to summertime fires, which threaten surrounding life and property. In the 21st century, wildfires have been larger and more common in the Deschutes National Forest. In September 2012, a lightning strike caused a fire that burned  in the Pole Creek area within the Three Sisters Wilderness, leaving the area closed until May 2013. In August 2017, officials closed  in the western half of the Three Sisters Wilderness, including  of the Pacific Crest Trail, to the public because of 11 lightning-caused fires, including the Milli Fire. As a result of the increasing incidence of fires, public officials have factored the role of wildfire into planning, including organizing prescribed fires with scientists to protect habitats at risk while minimizing adverse effects on air quality and environmental health.

Geology 

Broken Top is a complex stratovolcano. Like other Cascade volcanoes, Broken Top was fed by magma chambers produced by the subduction of the Juan de Fuca tectonic plate under the western edge of the North American tectonic plate. The mountain was also shaped by the changing climate of the Pleistocene Epoch, during which multiple glacial periods occurred and glacial advance eroded local mountains.

Broken Top joins several other volcanoes in the eastern segment of the Cascade Range known as the High Cascades, which trends from north–south. This includes the Three Sisters complex, Belknap Crater, Mount Washington, Black Butte, and Three Fingered Jack, and Mount Bachelor. Constructed towards the end of the Pleistocene epoch, these mountains are underlain by more ancient volcanoes that sank within parallel north–south trending faults in the surrounding region. The Three Sisters form the centerpiece of a region of closely grouped volcanic peaks, an exception to the typical  spacing between volcanoes elsewhere in the Cascades. This vicinity is among the most active volcanic areas in the Cascades and one of the most densely populated volcanic centers in the world, as well as the second largest volcanic field of silicic rock within the Quaternary Cascades. The  area from the Three Sisters to Broken Top and Mount Bachelor features at least 50 eruptive vents for rhyolitic and rhyodacitic lava.

East of Broken Top, the c, an  area of andesitic and mafic scoria cones, features similarly rhyolitic and rhyodacitic lava deposits. The Tumalo volcano spread ignimbrites and plinian deposits in ground eruptions across the area (Plinian eruptions are similar to the eruption of Vesuvius that destroyed Pompeii). These deposits spread from Tumalo to the town of Bend.

Eruptive history 

Broken Top's initial eruptions, beginning about 300,000 years ago during the middle of the Pleistocene epoch and overlapping with eruptions at the North Sister volcano, consisted of basaltic andesite lava that contributed to a base shield. The center of this edifice consists of oxidized agglomerate that was invaded by intrusive dikes and geologic sills. The scoria, dike rocks, and lava that comprised this cone had a uniform composition made up of phenocrysts with plagioclase, olivine, two types of pyroxene, and magnetite. Erratic eruptions continued afterward, erupting silicic lava off and on until 150,000 years ago, including pyroxene andesites that lacked olivine, as well as obsidian, which was rare among local volcanoes during that time period. Much of the current cone is occupied by flows from eruptions of mafic lava (rich in magnesium and iron) including andesite, dacite, rhyodacite, and pyroclastic flows. These deposits extend from the subordinate volcano to the summit, and reach Todd Lake Volcano as well as rhyodacitic lava at Tam MacArthur rim and Whychus Creek Falls. Though most of the material that forms Broken Top's volcanic cone originated from its main vent, the edifice was also built up by auxiliary vents on its flanks and parasitic cones that surrounded the main edifice. The side vents erupted to form fissure vents, producing basalt and andesite, while the parasitic vents erupted scoria.

Broken Top's volcanic crater, now  in diameter, was most likely created through subsidence, which created a depression that was filled with thick basaltic andesite lava flows topped by thin lavas. Once the volcano's central conduit congealed, it underwent hydrothermal alteration over time, which has been revealed by several cirques. The summit cone has also undergone extensive glacial erosion, with embayments and a major cirque on its southern side. It forms an amphitheatre shape that opens to the southeast. Due to this extensive erosion, the contents of Broken Top's cone are exposed, which allows volcanologists to classify Broken Top as a complex stratovolcano. Erosion has destroyed the original summit of the mountain, along with its southeastern slope and much of the volcano's interior, revealing purple, red, and black scoria layers that alternate with yellow, brown, and orange pumice and tuffs, along with white pumice interbedded in a matrix with black lava fragments.

Glaciation and flash floods 

During the late Pleistocene, Broken Top and its surroundings were almost entirely covered by glaciers. The only features in the area not buried by glaciers were the summit of Tumalo Mountain and the summit of Broken Top, including the northwest ridge crest. No geologic evidence suggests that any eruptive activity took place subglacially.

Both small ice streams, they have decreased significantly in size over the past few decades, and retreat continues at a rapid rate.

When Little Ice Age glaciers retreated during the 20th century, water filled in the spaces left behind, forming moraine-dammed lakes, which are more common in the Three Sisters Wilderness than anywhere else in the contiguous United States. The local area has a history of flash floods, including at Broken Top itself, where a flash flood took place on October 7, 1966. This lake sits at the foot of Crook Glacier and is fed by Bend Glacier. The event was likely initiated by glacial ice that fell into the lake, spawning a large wave that breached the moraine and drained  of water into a channel underneath the lake. The flood moved logs, rocks, and mud to the Sparks Lake meadow basin; it covered between 35 and 45 percent of the lake's basin with silt and deposited at least  of sediment in the lake and surrounding meadow.

Additional cones 

Todd Lake volcano, which erupted porphyritic andesite (andesite with distinct differences among its crystal size) with a pale gray color, sits at Broken Top's southern foot. Its lava flows have been exposed and are covered with red scoria and agglutinate from a separate volcanic vent. It began to erupt as Broken Top stopped eruptive activity, since the two have overlapping layers of lava.

As Pleistocene glaciers retreated, basaltic cinder cone volcanoes formed south of Todd Lake right as Cayuse Crater was forming. Cayuse Crater, an unrelated postglacial volcano which formed 11,000 years ago, also sits on Broken Top's southern flank. It is made up of basaltic lava and scoria that erupted after Broken Top ceased activity, suggesting that it formed due to an underlying magma chamber closer to South Sister. Cayuse Crater also consists partly of yellow lapilli tuff and tuff breccia. More recent Holocene activity on the volcano's flanks constructed basaltic lava flows, cones, and ash that have become interbedded with moraine and material from outwash plains from the Neoglacial period.

Ball Butte refers to an additional cone,  in elevation, which is considered one of Broken Top's subfeatures. There are also a number of parasitic cones in the area, which helped build Ball Butte over time. They also produced much red scoria and formed hot springs and fumaroles (openings in the earth that emit steam and gases).

During the late Pleistocene, six cinder cone and auxiliary vents between Broken Top and Tumalo Mountain erupted, yielding glomeroporphyritic basaltic andesite. They all likely derived from the same magma source.

Recent history and potential hazards 

When the first geological reconnaissance of the surrounding region was published in 1925, its author, Edwin T. Hodge, suggested that the Broken Top, the Three Sisters, and several other mountains in the area constituted the remains of an enormous collapsed volcano that had been active during the Miocene or early Pliocene epochs. Naming this ancient volcano , Hodge theorized that it had collapsed to form a caldera just as Mount Mazama collapsed to form Crater Lake. In the 1940s, Howel Williams completed an analysis of the vicinity and concluded that Multnomah had never existed, instead demonstrating that each volcano in the area possessed its own individual eruptive history. Williams' 1944 paper, titled "Volcanoes of the Three Sisters Region, Oregon Cascades", defined the basic outline of the region, though he lacked access to chemical techniques and radiometric dating.  geologist and volcanologist Edward Taylor's analysis in 1978 determined that the current Broken Top cone was constructed on basaltic andesite lavas that built a platform. As dikes and sills invaded the edifice over time, it formed a volcanic cone made of different lavas including basaltic andesite, dacite, and rhyodacite, as well as tephra and pyroclastic materials from more explosive eruptions.

Broken Top poses significant hazards to the surrounding area, especially within the proximal hazard zone with a diameter of  that surrounds Broken Top and the Three Sisters. A landslide at Broken Top, or an eruption from the nearby South Sister, could initiate a lahar (rapid flows of water, rock, and mud) that could cascade down river valleys in the surrounding area. Larger landslide events would most likely be the result of magma intrusion, and thus they would be predicted by seismometers and volcanic surveying devices.

An eruption from South Sister would pose a threat to nearby life, as the proximal danger zone extends  from the volcano's summits.

Over the course of the past century, five or more lahars have occurred at the Three Sisters and Broken Top, either as a result of glacier-outburst flooding or the failure of moraine-dammed lakes. Lakes with less threat of reaching the distal hazard zone include small lakes in the headwaters of Whychus Creek and the basin below .

Recreation 

Broken Top and the nearby Three Sisters represent a popular climbing destination for hikers and mountaineers. The United States Forest Service requires permits for use from Memorial Day (May 31) until the beginning of September, and dogs must be kept on leashes on the Green Lakes, Moraine Lakes, South Sister, Soda Creek, Todd Lake, and Crater Ditch trails from July 15 through September 15. Horses are prohibited, and ice axes are required during the winter climbing season for safety reasons. Motor vehicles and other mechanical means of transport such as bicycles, wagons, motorboats, and helicopters are generally prohibited within the Three Sisters Wilderness under the rules of the National Wilderness Preservation System. From Memorial Day to October 31, permits are required for entry to the area. Permits for average entry to the Three Sisters Wilderness are distributed, free, from Memorial Day (May 31) until Halloween (October 31). To gain access to the Obsidian area of the wilderness, special entry is required, for both day and overnight hikers. These passes are distributed only at McKenzie Ranger District in Willamette Forest and Sisters Ranger District in Deschutes Forest. The administration disallows any vehicle entry.

The hiking trail on Broken Top begins at the Green Lakes Basin at the trailhead east of Bend, running  and gaining  in elevation. It can be scrambled, though the route demands Yosemite Decimal System class 4 or lower class 5 climbing and has significant exposure. The Broken Top trail begins at a junction with the Green Lakes Trail. There is also an unofficial trail that runs up the moraine of Crook Glacier. The northern slopes of Broken Top can be accessed by trailheads north of Tam McArthur Rim, while its southern slopes can be reached by trailheads near Crater Creek.

See also 

 Geology of the Pacific Northwest

Footnotes 
 [a]  Sources disagree on the number of cirques that carved into Broken Top; Wood and Kienle (1992) say three cirques, but Williams (1944) claims that five cirques altered the volcano's core.

Notes

References

External links 

 
 

Stratovolcanoes of the United States
Volcanoes of Oregon
Mountains of Oregon
Subduction volcanoes
Cascade Volcanoes
Pleistocene stratovolcanoes
Volcanoes of Deschutes County, Oregon
Mountains of Deschutes County, Oregon